Rokytno is a municipality and village in Pardubice District in the Pardubice Region of the Czech Republic. It has about 900 inhabitants.

Administrative parts
Villages of Bohumileč and Drahoš are administrative parts of Rokytno.

Etymology
The name is derived from rokytí. It is an old Czech term for willows which grew here in swampy areas.

Geography
It lies in the East Elbe Table, in the Polabí region. The Bohumilečský pond is situated west of the village.

The Přesypy u Rokytna Nature Reserve is a unique area of sand dunes overgrown with pine forest.

History
The first written mention of Rokytno is from 1436. During the 18th century, the village, together with Chvojenec and Býšť, was the centre of persecuted religious sect of Deists called blouznivci. During the industrialization at the turn of the 19th and 20th centuries, two brickyards were built here.

The village of Drahoš was founded in 1782. It was settled by German-speaking farmers from the Province of Silesia.

Transport
The D35 motorway runs through the municipality.

References

External links

 

Villages in Pardubice District